Myshkinsky District is an administrative and municipal district (raion), one of the seventeen in Yaroslavl Oblast, Russia. It is located in the west of the oblast. Its administrative center is the town of Myshkin. Population: 10,329 (2010 Census);  The population of Myshkin accounts for 57.4% of the district's total population.

References

Sources

Districts of Yaroslavl Oblast